Nicht nachmachen! (English: Don't Imitate!) was a German comedy-documentary TV series that airs on ZDF and ZDFneo. The two hosts, Wigald Boning and Bernhard Hoëcker, defy the warnings and restrictions on various items to see what happens when they do. Some of their experiments include lighting fireworks inside a living room and trying to overfill a water bed to the point of bursting.

The series is an adaption of the Norwegian show Ikke gjør dette hjemme.

Episodes

Season 1
 Episode 1 - June 29, 2012
 Episode 2 - July 6, 2012
 Episode 3 - July 13, 2012
 Episode 4 - July 20, 2012
 Episode 5 - July 27, 2012
 Episode 6 - August 3, 2012

Season 2
 Episode 1 - July 26, 2013
 Episode 2 - August 2, 2013
 Episode 3 - August 9, 2013
 Episode 4 - August 16, 2013
 Episode 5 - August 23, 2013
 Episode 6 - August 30, 2013

References 

2012 German television series debuts
German comedy television series
German documentary television series
ZDF original programming
German-language television shows